The Fremont Cannon is the trophy awarded to the winner of the Battle for Nevada (also known as the Nevada–UNLV football rivalry), an American college football rivalry game played annually by the Nevada Wolf Pack football team of the University of Nevada, Reno (Nevada) and the UNLV Rebels football team of the University of Nevada, Las Vegas (UNLV). The trophy was built in 1970 and is a replica of a 19th-century Howitzer cannon that accompanied American explorer and politician John C. Frémont on an expedition to the American West and Nevada in the mid 19th century. The original cannon had been abandoned, due to heavy snows, in the Sierra Nevada in 1843. The replica cannon was originally fired following a touchdown by the team in possession of the cannon, but it has been inoperable since 1999. The wooden carriage is painted the school color of the team in possession, navy blue for Nevada or scarlet for UNLV. The trophy is the heaviest and most expensive in college football. Since 2012, the game is also part of the Silver State Series (formerly Governor's Series), the series of athletic competitions between the two schools.

The first game between the teams was in 1969 with Nevada defeating UNLV. The following year, the cannon was built and UNLV became the first team to win the cannon. Nevada has the longest win streak in the rivalry, having held the cannon for eight consecutive years.

UNLV is the current holder of the trophy after defeating Nevada on November 26, 2022, at Allegiant Stadium.

History of the trophy
In 1967, Bill Ireland was hired by Nevada Southern University (the predecessor to UNLV) to coach their new football team and by 1969 came up with the idea to have a trophy as a symbol of the rivalry between the two schools. Ireland was the first football coach of the UNLV Rebels and an alumnus and former coach of Nevada.  The cannon was donated by Kennecott Copper and is a replica of a howitzer cannon that explorer John C. Fremont used on an expedition in 1843 and left in a large snowdrift in the Sierra Nevada mountains. The cannon contains a  barrel, weighs , and cost $10,000 to build, making it the heaviest and most expensive trophy in college football.  The cannon is painted the winning team's color, red for UNLV, and blue for Nevada.

The two schools first played each other on November 22, 1969, the Saturday before Thanksgiving Day. This game was homecoming for Nevada, who won the game 30–28. At the time, construction of the cannon had yet to be completed. The first competition for the cannon was in 1970 when the Rebels won 42–30 in Las Vegas.  In 1978, following Nevada's first victory over UNLV in four seasons, Chris Ault convinced security at McCarran International Airport to allow the team to disassemble the cannon and take it as carry-on luggage back to Reno. The team had to figure out how to break down the cannon, a task that was usually done by the Reserve Officers' Training Corps, which UNLV did not have in 1978.

The Fremont Cannon was refurbished by the UNLV athletics department at a cost of $1,500 in 2000 following damage after a UNLV victory celebration wherein fans and players attempted to lift the cannon and dropped it.  Traditionally, the team possessing the cannon would fire it each time they scored a touchdown during the rivalry game; however, the cannon has not been fired since the restoration due to the damage it received.

History of the rivalry

Students of Nevada's two public universities share a mutual disdain for each other, as evidenced by the numerous blue "FUNLV" (UNLV being shorthand for University of Nevada, Las Vegas) and red "FUNR" shirts (UNR being shorthand for University of Nevada, Reno) at the stadium on rivalry days.

In 1993, Wolf Pack coach Jeff Horton left Nevada after one season to coach for UNLV in what is referred to as the "Red Defection".

The rivalry is heated inside the stadium as well. Sam Boyd Stadium and Mackay Stadium are two of the few NCAA football venues remaining to sell alcohol to all spectators of legal age on game day (many institutions either do not sell alcohol at all, or sell it only to those seated in luxury boxes). This, combined with the heated nature of the rivalry, has resulted in numerous fights in the stands. In 1995, UNLV players allegedly started a pre-game brawl, which prompted the Wolf Pack to run up the score in their 55–32 victory against UNLV. After the game, UNLV player Quincy Sanders threw his helmet in the direction of Nevada head coach Chris Ault.

On August 18, 2010, Nevada announced that they would join the Mountain West Conference starting in either 2011 or 2012; their entry was later confirmed for 2012. Since UNLV has been in the Mountain West Conference since 1999, the annual rivalry game is once again a conference game. When the MW expanded to 12 football members in 2013 and split into divisions for that sport, both schools were placed in the West Division, assuring annual matchups for the foreseeable future. Before 2012, the last meeting of the two schools as conference rivals was in 1995, when both schools were members of the Big West Conference.

On October 8, 2012, Nevada Governor Brian Sandoval announced the launch of the Governor's Series for the annual Nevada vs. UNLV rivalry games for all athletic teams. In 2018, it was later renamed as the Silver State Series.

Game results

Coaching records
Since first game on November 22, 1969

Nevada

 Chris Ault's overall record in series is 16–6–0

UNLV

See also
 List of NCAA college football rivalry games

Notes

References

External links
 whatcoloristhefremontcannon.com (Single-serving site to show the current color of the Fremont Cannon) 

1969 establishments in Nevada
College football rivalry trophies in the United States
Nevada Wolf Pack football
UNLV Rebels football